Carl-Gustaf Nabb (born 9 September 1936) is a Finnish footballer. He played in three matches for the Finland national football team in 1960 and 1961.

References

1936 births
Living people
Finnish footballers
Finland international footballers
Place of birth missing (living people)
Association footballers not categorized by position